The FEBS Journal is a biweekly peer-reviewed scientific journal published by John Wiley & Sons on behalf of the Federation of European Biochemical Societies. It covers research on all aspects of biochemistry, molecular biology, cell biology, and the molecular bases of disease. The editor-in-chief is Seamus Martin (Trinity College Dublin), who took over from Richard Perham (University of Cambridge) in 2014.  

Content is available for free 1 year after publication, except review content, which is available immediately. The journal also publishes special and virtual issues focusing on a specific theme.

Since 2021, the journal has given an annual award, "The FEBS Journal Richard Perham Prize", for an outstanding research paper published in the journal. The winners receive a €5,000 cash prize (to be divided equally between the first and last authors) and the senior author of the study is invited to give a talk at the FEBS Annual Congress. The journal also gives more frequent poster prize awards to early-career scientists presenting at conferences.

History
The journal was established in 1906 by Carl Neuberg, who also served as the first editor-in-chief. Its original name was Biochemische Zeitschrift. It was renamed to the European Journal of Biochemistry in 1967, with Claude Liébecq as editor-in-chief, succeeded by Richard Perham, during whose tenure the name became the FEBS Journal, in 2005.

Notable papers

During the early years the Biochemisches Zeitschrift published numerous papers important in the history of biochemistry, including that of  Michaelis and  Menten.

The two name changes make it difficult to compare all the most notable papers published in the journal, but some are the following:

Biochemische Zeitschrift

 (3667 citations)

 (2188 citations)

 (1237 citations)

European Journal of Biochemistry

 (9207 citations)

 (4971 citations)

 (4925 citations)

FEBS Journal

 (964 citations)

 (807 citations)

 (758 citations)

Abstracting and indexing
The journal is abstracted and indexed in:

According to the Journal Citation Reports, the journal has a 2019 impact factor of 4.392.

References

External links
 
instagram

Biochemistry journals
Wiley (publisher) academic journals
Publications established in 1906
English-language journals
Biweekly journals
Delayed open access journals
Academic journals associated with learned and professional societies